Francisco Antolínez de Sarabia (1645–1700) was a historical and landscape painter who studied in the school of Murillo, whose style and manner of colouring he followed.

He was born at Seville, and was a nephew of José Antolínez.  He went to his uncle at Madrid in 1672; but notwithstanding his having already distinguished himself as a painter, he left the profession for literary pursuits, and for the purpose of obtaining a lucrative situation at the bar, having been originally educated at Seville for the law. Being unsuccessful, he was compelled again to have recourse to painting, as a means of subsistence. It was then that he produced those small pictures from the Bible and the life of the Virgin, which are so much admired by amateurs for their invention, colour, and facility of execution. He died in 1700, regretted by the true friends of art, who lamented the misapplication of those talents with which he was endowed.

Works
His paintings included:

Flight into Egypt (undated), oil on panel, 45 by 73 cm, now in the Prado, Madrid
Jacob and Rachel at the Well (1670), now at the El Paso Museum of Art
The Adoration of the Pastors (1678), Seville Cathedral
Desposorios de la Virgen
The Annunciation, Prado, Madrid
The Adoration of the Kings (La Adoración de los Reyes), Prado, Madrid

Other paintings by Antolínez are now at the Budapest Castle and the Art Institute of Chicago being a few listed.

References
Agüera Ros, José Carlos, Cuadros del pintor sevillano Francisco Antolínez Saravia (c. 1645-1700) en el monasterio de Santa Cruz de Sahagún (León), Boletín del Seminario de Estudios de Arte y Arqueología, no. 61, 1995, p. 405-412.
Lozano López, Juan Carlos, Una serie inédita del pintor Francisco Antolínez en la iglesia parroquial de Brea de Aragón (Zaragoza), Artigrama, no. 17, 2002, p. 329-340
Palomino, Antonio (1988). El museo pictórico y escala óptica III. El parnaso español pintoresco laureado. Madrid, Aguilar S.A. de Ediciones, p. 46. .
Rivera de las Heras, José Ángel, Una serie inédita del pintor Francisco Antolínez en la iglesia de Nuestra Señora de los Remedios de Zamora, BSAA arte, LXXI, 2005, p. 357-366.
Signos. Arts and Culture in Huesca (Arte y cultura en Huesca. De Forment a Lastanosa.) Siglos XVI-XVII, exposition catalog, Huesca, 1994, p. 296, 
Valdivieso, Enrique, Historia de la pintura sevillana (History of Paintings from Seville), 1992. Guadalquivir S.L., Publishers. .

Attribution:
 

1645 births
1700 deaths
17th-century Spanish painters
Spanish male painters
People from Seville